This article displays the rosters for the participating teams at the 2012 FIBA Africa Club Championship for Women.

Abidjan Basket Club

Club Sportif d'Abidjan

Club Sportif Sfaxien

Eagle Wings

First Bank

First Deepwater

Interclube

Liga Muçulmana de Maputo

Ndella

Primeiro de Agosto

References

External links
 2012 FIBA Africa Champions Cup Participating Teams

FIBA Africa Women's Clubs Champions Cup squads
Basketball teams in Africa
FIBA
FIBA